Nameirakpam Montesori Chanu (born 1 February 1992) is an Indian footballer who plays as a midfielder. She has been a member of the India women's national team.

Honours

India
 SAFF Championship: 2012, 2014

References

1992 births
Footballers from Manipur
Living people
India women's international footballers
Indian women's footballers
Sportswomen from Manipur
Women's association football midfielders